Berens River Airport  is located adjacent to the mouth of Berens River, Manitoba, Canada and serves the Berens River First Nation. The airport serves several small local airlines including Kitchi Airways, Northway Aviation, Lakeside Aviation, and Perimeter Aviation. There are six flights a week to and from Winnipeg via Perimeter Aviation.

Airlines and destinations

References

External links
Berens River Airport on COPA's Places to Fly airport directory

Certified airports in Manitoba

Transport in Northern Manitoba